Ophrys omegaifera, the omega bee-orchid, is a species of orchid native to the Mediterranean region from Portugal and Morocco to Syria.

Subspecies and varieties
Numerous subspecific and varietal names have been proposed. At present (May 2014), 6 such names are recognized:

Ophrys omegaifera var. basilissa (C.Alibertis, A.Alibertis & H.R.Reinhard) Faurh - Greece
Ophrys omegaifera subsp. dyris (Maire) Del Prete - Spain, Portugal, Morocco, Balearic Islands
Ophrys omegaifera subsp. fleischmannii (Hayek) Del Prete - Crete and other Greek islands
Ophrys omegaifera subsp. hayekii (H.Fleischm. & Soó) Kreutz  - Sicily, Algeria, Tunisia
Ophrys omegaifera subsp. israelitica (H.Baumann & Künkele) G.Morschek & K.Morschek - Israel, Palestine, Lebanon, Syria, Turkey, Cyprus, Greece 
Ophrys omegaifera subsp. omegaifera - Turkey, Greek islands
Ophrys omegaifera subsp. apollonae - Turkey, Greek islands

References

External links 

omegaifera
Flora of North Africa
Flora of Southeastern Europe
Flora of Southwestern Europe
Flora of Western Asia
Plants described in 1925